Grace Hospital may refer to:

Fictional
 The fictional Seattle Grace Hospital in Seattle, Washington, which is the setting for the ABC series Grey's Anatomy

Active
 Grace Hospital (Morganton), Morganton, North Carolina, United States
 Grace Hospital (Richmond, Virginia)
 Grace Hospital (Winnipeg)
 Sinai-Grace Hospital, Detroit, Michigan
 Toronto Grace Health Centre, Toronto, Ontario, Canada

Defunct
 B.C. Women's Hospital & Health Centre (formerly Grace Hospital), Vancouver, British Columbia, Canada
 Birchmount Hospital (formerly Scarborough Grace Hospital), Toronto, Ontario, Canada
 Boston Emergency and General Hospital, which was known as Grace Hospital from 1906 to 1912
 Grace Hospital (Seattle)
 Grace Maternity Hospital in Halifax, Nova Scotia which merged with Izaak Walton Killam Hospital in 1996. Now known as IWK Health Centre
 Grace Hospital in New Haven, Connecticut, which merged with New Haven Hospital in 1945. Now known as Yale New Haven Hospital